Homicide for Three is a 1948 American crime film directed by George Blair and written by Bradbury Foote and Albert DeMond. The film stars Warren Douglas, Audrey Long, Grant Withers, Lloyd Corrigan, Stephanie Bachelor and George Lynn. The film was released on December 8, 1948 by Republic Pictures.

Plot
A Navy Lieutenant on shore leave and his wife of one year can't find a hotel room to enjoy their first night alone since they eloped a year earlier.  An oddly dressed women in the lobby gives up her room in "an act of charity".  The Navy Lieutenant then has his white uniform stolen while he is in the steam bath:  and is given a civilian suit by the house dick.  Shortly thereafter, sitting at the bar together, the Navy Lieutenant and his wife are approached by a somewhat distinguished fellow guest who confuses Iris Duluth with "her cousin Mona" whose picture had appeared in that morning's paper.

Cast    
Warren Douglas as Lt. Peter Duluth
Audrey Long as Iris Duluth 
Grant Withers as Joe Hatch 
Lloyd Corrigan as Emmanuel Catt
Stephanie Bachelor as Collette Rose
George Lynn as Bill Daggett
Tala Birell as Rita Brown
Benny Baker as Timothy 
Joseph Crehan as Capt. Webb
Sid Tomack as Cab Driver
Dick Elliott as Doorman
Eddie Dunn as Circus Doorman
John Newland as Desk Clerk
Billy Curtis as Billy Curtis
Patsy Moran as Maid

References

External links 
 

1948 films
American crime films
1948 crime films
Republic Pictures films
Films directed by George Blair
American black-and-white films
1940s English-language films
1940s American films